The following is a complete discography for Suicide Squeeze Records, an independent record label in Seattle, Washington. Founded in 1996, the label mostly releases rock, pop, and metal, as well as occasional comedy and performance art CD and DVDs. Formats also include 12" and 7" vinyl.

The label got its start releasing singles by artists such as Elliott Smith and Modest Mouse, later releasing albums by bands such as the Melvins and These Arms Are Snakes. Suicide Squeeze has released a number of compilation albums as well, and the current artists are The Coathangers, Nü Sensae, This Will Destroy You, Audacity, Guantanamo Baywatch, White Woods, and Yamantaka // Sonic Titan.

See also

Discography

References

External links

Discographies of American record labels